Vadu Crișului is a commune in Bihor County, Crișana, Romania with a population of 4,009 people. It is composed of four villages: Birtin (Bertény), Topa de Criș (Köröstopa), Tomnatic (Tomnatek) and Vadu Crișului.

References

Communes in Bihor County
Localities in Crișana